Hit Parade is Audio Adrenaline's first greatest hits album. It features fifteen hits from the band's previous albums, plus two new songs: "Will Not Fade" and "One Like You".

Reception

The album received favorable reviews from critics with John DiBiase, of Jesus Freak Hideout, giving it 4.5 stars out of 5. DiBiase classified it as "one of the best and most solid collections" he has heard while calling the two new songs as "superb". Dacia Blodgett-Williams, of AllMusic, gave the album 3 stars out of 5, writing that "while no doubt original in many aspects, all of Audio Adrenaline's music on this particular album began to sound alike after several tracks." She also classified the song "Get Down" as "the best introduction to the group, and perhaps the most original in its sound."

Track listing

Personnel

 Mark Stuart - lead vocals
 Bob Herdman - guitars, keyboards
 Will McGinniss - bass
 Tyler Burkum - guitars
 Ben Cissell - drums

References

Audio Adrenaline albums
2001 greatest hits albums
ForeFront Records compilation albums